Ortaköy (Turkish for "middle village") is a northern suburb of Nicosia, Cyprus. It is under the de facto control of Northern Cyprus.

Culture, sports, and tourism
Turkish Cypriot Ortaköy Sports Club was founded in 1952, and in 2015 in Cyprus Turkish Football Association (CTFA) K-PET 2nd League.

References

Communities in Nicosia District
Populated places in Lefkoşa District
Suburbs of Nicosia